Who Are You? is a 2013 South Korean television series starring So Yi-hyun, Ok Taecyeon, and Kim Jae-wook. It aired on tvN from July 29 to September 17, 2013 on Mondays and Tuesdays at 23:00 (and simultaneously broadcast on OnStyle) for 16 episodes.

Synopsis
Detective Yang Shi-ohn (So Yi-hyun) wakes up from a six-year coma. She gets reassigned to the lost and found department, where she discovers that she's gained the supernatural ability to see ghosts connected to the objects left behind there. Along with her new partner, rookie cop Cha Gun-woo (Ok Taecyeon) who's a hotheaded skeptic, Shi-ohn uses the information to solve cold cases. Gun-woo only believes in tangible things he can see, hear and touch, but he gradually comes to trust Shi-ohn, and together, the bickering partners help the spirits fulfill their dying wishes and unfinished business before passing on to the afterlife.

One of the ghosts watching over Shi-ohn is her ex-boyfriend Lee Hyung-joon (Kim Jae-wook), another detective who died that night six years ago when Shi-ohn received the serious head injury that nearly killed her and left her comatose. They were working on a big case together, but Shi-ohn has no memory of what happened that fateful night.

Cast

Main
 So Yi-hyun as Yang Shi-ohn
 Ok Taecyeon as Cha Gun-woo
 Kim Jae-wook as Lee Hyung-joon

Supporting
 Kim Chang-wan as Choi Moon-shik
 Park Young-ji as Moon Heung-joo
 Kim Ki-chun as Jung Tae-soo
 Kim Kyung-beom as Team leader Bong
 Kim Ye-won as Jang Hee-bin
 Noh Young-hak as Im Sung-chan
 Oh Hee-joon as Seung-ha

Special appearances
 Moon Ga-young as Dan Oh-reum (ep. 1-2)
 Jo Seung-hyun as Bae Kyung-min (ep. 1-2)
 Jang Hyun-sung as Park Hyung-jin, psychiatrist (ep. 1-2)
 Kim Seung-soo as Park Eung-joon, prosecutor (ep. 3-4, 13)
 Kim Young-ran as Eung-joon's mother (ep. 3-4)
 Kim Byung-choon as Mr. Wang (ep. 9-10)
 Choi Woo-shik as Hee-koo, hacker (ep. 10, 12)
 Kim Yoon-hye as Im Jung-eun (ep. 16)

Ratings
In this table,  represent the lowest ratings and  represent the highest ratings.

International broadcast
  Japan - DATV: beginning April 2, 2014.
  Thailand - Workpoint TV: Beginning November 22, 2014. It is also available to stream on Iflix with subtitles.
  Sri Lanka: It is available to stream on Iflix with subtitles.
  Indonesia: It is available to stream on Iflix with subtitles. 
  Malaysia: It is available to stream on Iflix with subtitles. 
  Philippines: It is available to stream on Iflix with subtitles.

References

External links
 Who Are You? official tvN website 
 
 

2013 South Korean television series debuts
2013 South Korean television series endings
Korean-language television shows
TVN (South Korean TV channel) television dramas
South Korean crime television series
South Korean mystery television series
Television series by AStory